Felimare bilineata is a species of colourful sea slug or dorid nudibranch, a marine gastropod mollusc in the family Chromodorididae.

Subspecies
 Felimare bilineata bilineata (Pruvot-Fol, 1953)
 Felimare bilineata senegalensis (Ortea, Valdés & García-Gómez, 1996)
 Felimare bilineata viridis (Ortea, Valdés & García-Gómez, 1996)

Distribution
This nudibranch is known from the Eastern Atlantic Ocean (from Portugal to Ghana) and the Western Mediterranean.

Description
Felimare bilineata has a blue body with an orange-lined mantle. The upper dorsum and body have one or two orange longitudinal lines running down the length of the animal. The gills and rhinophores are black, edged with orange. There are two lines at the base of the outer side of each gill, converging at the tip. This species can reach a total length of at least .

References

Chromodorididae
Gastropods described in 1953
Taxa named by Alice Pruvot-Fol